The Pumas Morelos was a football club that played in the Segunda División in Cuernavaca, Morelos, Mexico. The Pumas Morelos are affiliated to Pumas UNAM. The most goals scored were made by Alex Castańeda which were 36. The team was bought by AMRH International Soccer alongside former players Jorge Campos and Claudio Suárez in 2012.  The team continued to play in the Clausura 2013 before being dissolved as Pumas Morelos.

Current squad

References

External links
 clubpumasunam.com
 

Mexican reserve football clubs
Association football clubs established in 2006
Ascenso MX teams
Mor
2006 establishments in Mexico